Robert Anthony Tracy (October 17, 1928 – May 10, 2008) was an  American football, basketball, track, and cross country coach. He was the eighth head football coach at Dickinson State College—now known as Dickinson State University–in Dickinson, North Dakota, serving for six seasons, from 1957 to  1962, and compiling a record of 25–18–1.

A native of Waubay, South Dakota, competed in football and track at Northern State Teachers College—now known as Northern State University—in Aberdeen, South Dakota, before graduating in 1954. He was a center, guard, tackle on the football team and a weightman on the track team. Tracy was the head track coach and an assistant football coach at Northern State for two years before he was appointed head coach in football and track at Dickinson State in May 1957. He was also the head basketball coach at Dickinson State for one season, in 1962–63, tallying a mark of 12–10. Tracy resigned from Dickinson State in May 1963 to take a job as head track coach and line coach for the football team at St. Cloud State University in St. Cloud, Minnesota.

After working as an assistant track coach at the University of Minnesota, Tracy was appointed an assistant professor of physical education at the University of Hawaiʻi at Mānoa in 1971. He was head coach of the men's and women's track teams at Hawaii from 1972 to 1976. There he mentored Terry Albritton when Albritton set the world record in shot put in 1976.

Head coaching record

College football

References

External links
 

1928 births
2008 deaths
American football centers
American football guards
American football tackles
Dickinson State Blue Hawks football coaches
Dickinson State Blue Hawks men's basketball coaches
Hawaii Rainbow Warriors and Rainbow Wahine track and field coaches
Minnesota Golden Gophers track and field coaches
Northern State Wolves football coaches
Northern State Wolves football players
St. Cloud State Huskies football coaches
College cross country coaches in the United States
College men's track and field athletes in the United States
High school football coaches in South Dakota
University of Hawaiʻi faculty
People from Day County, South Dakota
Coaches of American football from South Dakota
Players of American football from South Dakota
Track and field athletes from South Dakota